Tisaleo Canton is a canton of Ecuador, located in the Tungurahua Province.  Its capital is the town of Tisaleo.  Its population at the 2001 census was 10,525.

References

Cantons of Tungurahua Province